Paulo Sérgio Ferreira Gomes (born 21 July 1981 in Cabo Frio, Rio de Janeiro), known as Paulo Sérgio, is a Brazilian footballer who plays as a defensive midfielder for FC Bern.

References

External links

1981 births
Living people
Brazilian footballers
Association football midfielders
Moreirense F.C. players
Associação Académica de Coimbra – O.A.F. players
U.D. Leiria players
S.C. Beira-Mar players
Ettifaq FC players
Malaysia Super League players
PKNS F.C. players
Cypriot First Division players
Ayia Napa FC players
AEK Kouklia F.C. players
Muscat Club players
FC Bern players
Primeira Liga players
Liga Portugal 2 players
Segunda Divisão players
Saudi Professional League players
Brazilian expatriate footballers
Expatriate footballers in Portugal
Expatriate footballers in Saudi Arabia
Expatriate footballers in Malaysia
Expatriate footballers in Cyprus
Expatriate footballers in Oman
Expatriate footballers in Switzerland
Brazilian expatriate sportspeople in Portugal
Brazilian expatriate sportspeople in Saudi Arabia
Brazilian expatriate sportspeople in Malaysia
Brazilian expatriate sportspeople in Cyprus
Brazilian expatriate sportspeople in Oman
Brazilian expatriate sportspeople in Switzerland
Sportspeople from Rio de Janeiro (state)